Kerim Sarp Apak (born 11 November 1981) is a Turkish actor.

Early life 
Apak was born and raised in Diyarbakır until the age of five, before moving with his family to Bursa. His parents were from Adana and Antakya. He later studied at the Bursa Boys High School.

Career 

Apak planned to study business administration but instead took part in theatre classes. After finishing his studies at Dokuz Eylül University School of Fine Arts in 2004, he moved to Istanbul with the help of his instructor.

He was first noted with his role in Ağır Roman, which went on stage at Sadri Alışık Theatre. He then joined Yılmaz Erdoğan's BKM Group and was cast in a small role in Organize İşler. He then had roles in the series Anadolu Kaplanı and En Son Babalar Duyar. Apak also played in the children's play Sizinkiler Dünya Kaç Bucak and went on tour across Turkey. 

After doing a stand-up comedy under the title Mutfak, he had his breakthrough with his role as Tanrıverdi in the hit sitcomAvrupa Yakası. He joined hit series "Kavak Yelleri" (remake of Dawson's Creek). He played in hit sitcom "Yalan Dünya".

In October 2015, Apak was sentenced to 10 months in prison for "using drugs" according to the decision of the Istanbul 19th Central Criminal Court, and was acquitted of the charge of "establishing, managing and being a member of a drug ring". The court postponed the sentence as the prison sentence was less than a year.

Theatre 
 Öp Babanın Elini
 Sizinkiler Dünya Kaç Bucak
 Ağır Roman (play)|Ağır Roman
 BKM Mutfak
 Çok Güzel Hareketler Bunlar
 Yoldan Çıkan Oyun

Filmography

Film 
 Organize İşler (2005) - Kemal
 Beyaz Melek (2007) - Reşat
 Plajda (2008) - Ali 
 O... Çocukları (2008) - Saffet
 Güneşi Gördüm (2009) - Ahmet
 Yedi Kocalı Hürmüz (2009) - Fişek Ömer
 Yeraltı (2012) - Barmen
 Karışık Kaset(2014) - Ulaş
 Yaktın Beni (2015) - Selam
 Ölümlü Dünya (2018)

Television 
 Avrupa Yakası (2006–2009) - Tanrıverdi Ekşioğulları
 Kavak Yelleri (2009–2011) Güven Karakuş
 Yalan Dünya (2011–2014) - Emir Danışman
 Jet Sosyete (2018–2020) - Ozan Özpamuk
 Kaderimin Oyunu (2021–) - Mahir

As guest actor 
 En Son Babalar Duyar (2002) - İsmail
 Anadolu Kaplanı (2006)
 Aşk Tutulması (2008) 
 Aşk Geliyorum Demez (2009) - Berkcan
 Çok Güzel Hareketler Bunlar (2008 / 2010)
 Aşağı Yukarı Yemişlililer (2011)
 Komedi Türkiye (2015)

References

External links 
 
 

1981 births
Turkish male film actors
Turkish male stage actors
Turkish male television actors
Dokuz Eylül University alumni
People from Diyarbakır
Living people
21st-century Turkish male actors